Almas Bobby is a Pakistani transgender activist and former television host. She is the President of the Shemale Foundation Pakistan.

In July 2018, Almas Bobby declared  of assets in the tax amnesty scheme.

References

Living people
Pakistani transgender people
Pakistani activists
Year of birth missing (living people)
Pakistani LGBT rights activists
21st-century Pakistani LGBT people